Aitz Hayim Center for Jewish Living is a post-denominational synagogue in Glencoe, Illinois. Founded in 1992 as a member-led congregation by Dr. Marc Slutsky, Steven Silberman, and Rabbi Irwin Kula, cited as the 8th most influential rabbi in U.S and the 11th most influential Jew in the world (Irwin Kula) and serves as a synagogue community recognizing and drawing ideology from multiple Jewish traditions.

References

External links 
  
 Founder Rabbi Irwin Kula

1994 establishments in Illinois
Synagogues in Glencoe, Illinois
Jewish community organizations
Jewish organizations established in 1994